was a town located in Fugeshi District, Ishikawa Prefecture, Japan.

As of 2003, the town had an estimated population of 10,596 and a density of 91.76 persons per km². The total area was 115.48 km².

On March 1, 2005, Noto absorbed the village of Yanagida (also from Fugeshi District), and the town of Uchiura (from Suzu District), to create the new town of Noto (in the newly created Hōsu District, Ishikawa, which was created at the same day) and no longer exists as in independent municipality.

External links
 Official website 

Dissolved municipalities of Ishikawa Prefecture
Noto, Ishikawa